Cicatripraonetha is a genus of beetle in the family Cerambycidae. Its only species is Cicatripraonetha lumawigi. It was described by Stephan von Breuning in 1980.

References

Pteropliini
Beetles described in 1980